Louis Deloy (born 1894, date of death unknown) was a French sports shooter. He competed in two events at the 1924 Summer Olympics.

References

External links
 

1894 births
Year of death missing
French male sport shooters
Olympic shooters of France
Shooters at the 1924 Summer Olympics
Place of birth missing